The Black Rock mine is a mine located at Hotazel (John Taolo Gaetsewe District Municipality) in the Northern Cape province of South Africa. Black Rock represents one of the largest manganese reserves in South Africa having estimated reserves of 70.4 million tonnes of manganese ore grading 39% manganese metal.

References

External links
 Black Rock Mine

Manganese mines in South Africa
Economy of the Northern Cape
John Taolo Gaetsewe District Municipality